Anderssonoceras is a genus of small, smooth ammonites with a flared umbilical shoulder, like Prototoceras, assigned to the ceratitid family Anderssonoceratidae as the type, but once included in the Otoceratidae.

Anderssonoceras comes from the Upper Permian of China.

References 

 Arkell et al., Mesozoic Ammonoidea, Treatise on Invertebrate Paleontology, Part L. Geol Soc of America and Univ Kansas press, 1957. R. C. Moore (ed) 
 D. Korn 2006 Paleozoic ammonoid classification—rft July 2010   
 E. T. Tozer. 1981. Triassic Ammonoidea: Classification, evolution and relationship with Permian and Jurassic Forms. ...- rft July 2010 

Ceratitida genera
Prehistoric animals of China
Permian ammonites